The Roman Catholic Diocese of Yamoussoukro is a diocese located in the city of Yamoussoukro in the Ecclesiastical province of Bouaké in Côte d'Ivoire.

History
 March 6, 1992: Established as Diocese of Yamoussoukro from the Diocese of Bouaké

Special churches

The Cathedral is the Cathédrale Saint-Augustin in Yamoussoukro.  The Minor Basilica   Basilique Notre-Dame de la Paix in Yamoussoukro is the second largest church in the world.

Bishops
 Bishops of Yamoussoukro (Roman rite)
 Bishop Bernard Agré (1992.03.06 – 1994.12.19), appointed Archbishop of Abidjan (Cardinal in 2001)
 Bishop Paul-Siméon Ahouanan Djro, O.F.M. (1995.12.06 – 2006.01.12), appointed Coadjutor Archbishop of Bouaké
 Bishop Joseph Aké (2006.07.21 - 2008.11.22), appointed Archbishop of Gagnoa
 Bishop Marcellin Yao Kouadio (2009.07.01 - 2018.04.25), appointed Bishop of Daloa

See also
Roman Catholicism in Côte d'Ivoire
List of Roman Catholic dioceses in Côte d'Ivoire

Sources
 GCatholic.org
 Catholic Hierarchy

Roman Catholic dioceses in Ivory Coast
Christian organizations established in 1992
Yamoussoukro
Roman Catholic dioceses and prelatures established in the 20th century
Roman Catholic Ecclesiastical Province of Bouaké